"Good Girl" is a song by American country music artist Carrie Underwood. The song was written by Chris DeStefano, Ashley Gorley and Underwood. It was released by Arista Nashville as the lead single from Underwood's fourth studio album, Blown Away (2012).

Underwood debuted the song in a live performance during the annual Country Radio Seminar (CRS) event in Nashville on February 23, 2012. The song was sent to country radio stations directly following the performance. It was made available for purchase as a digital download on February 23, 2012. "Good Girl" officially impacted country radio on February 27, 2012 and was officially released to Hot AC radio on April 23, 2012.

Background
On January 25, 2012, Underwood announced on her official website that the new single will be released in February. She co-wrote the song with Chris DeStefano and Ashley Gorley. Gorley has previously worked with Underwood on her singles "Don't Forget to Remember Me" and "All-American Girl."

Content

"Good Girl" is about Underwood warning a good girl about her ex-boyfriend, saying that he is actually no good, and that she is better off without him.

The song is in C minor, with an approximate tempo of 126 beats per minute. It does not use full chords, but rather a pattern of open fifths consisting of C5-F5-E5-B5. Underwood's vocal ranges from G3 to F5.

Critical reception
Upon its release, "Good Girl" received general acclaim. Roughstock gave the song four stars and praised that "this is the best uptempo vocal that Carrie Underwood has given country radio.". Bill Lamb of About.com gave the song four out of five stars, noting that the song "crackles with rock guitar and vocal fireworks while encouraging audience participation with a singalong chorus that is pure pop." Bill Dukes of Taste of Country rated the song four and a half stars, saying, "By the third spin her confidence, energy and sheer talent will seduce you into believing every eighth-note couldn’t be more perfectly placed." Kevin John Coyne of Country Universe gave the song a grade A and called it "an absolutely exhilarating record".

Live Performances
Underwood performed the song in June 2012 at the CMT Music Awards. She performed it on April 1, 2012 at the Academy of Country Music awards. On May 15, 2012, she performed it on an episode of Dancing With the Stars. On May 1, 2012, she performed several new songs from Blown Away for Good Morning America. On June 21, 2012, she performed it at Royal Albert Hall. She performed it for the 2022 CMA Music Festival, which aired August 3.

Music video
The short preview of the music video premiered on Entertainment Tonight on March 12, 2012. Later that night, the full video was released on Underwood's official Vevo page. It features Underwood playing a "Good Girl", and another girl, trying to persuade her character that the man she is with is no good.

The music video for "Good Girl" won Video of the Year at the 2012 CMT Music Awards as voted by fans. It was directed by Theresa Wingert and edited by Jacquelyn London.

Commercial performance
"Good Girl" was released for purchase on iTunes at 10pm on February 23, 2012. It sold 108,000 digital downloads in its first 3 days of sales, making it Underwood's fastest selling single ever. As of December 4, 2012, "Good Girl" has been certified Platinum in Canada, with more than 80,000 digital copies being sold. As of July 2020, "Good Girl" has sold 3 million copies in the United States.

Track listing
Digital download
 "Good Girl" — 3:25

Awards and nominations

American Country Awards

|-
| style="text-align:center;"|2012 || style="text-align:center;"| "Good Girl" || style="text-align:center;"| Female Music Video of the Year || 
|-
| style="text-align:center;"|2012 || style="text-align:center;"| "Good Girl" || style="text-align:center;"| Female Single of the Year ||

CMT Music Awards

|-
| style="text-align:center;"|2012 || style="text-align:center;"| "Good Girl" || style="text-align:center;"| Video of the Year || 
|-
| style="text-align:center;"|2012 || style="text-align:center;"| "Good Girl" || style="text-align:center;"| Female Video of the Year ||

World Music Awards

|-
| style="text-align:center;"|2013 || style="text-align:center;"| "Good Girl" || style="text-align:center;"| World's Best Music Video ||

Chart performance
With only 3 days of airplay, "Good Girl" debuted at number 30 on Billboard Hot Country Songs and debuted on the Billboard Hot 100 at number 24. It peaked at number 18 on the Billboard Hot 100, giving Underwood her twelfth top 20 on the chart. It also debuted at number 33 on the Canadian Hot 100 chart for the week of March 10, 2012. The song made its debut on the UK Radio Airplay chart the week beginning April 1. It was the highest new entry that week, debuting at 56. "Good Girl" hit number one on Hot Country Songs, becoming Underwood's twelfth number one hit on the chart. The song is also her second highest-charting song on Adult Pop Songs behind "Before He Cheats", peaking at 20.

Charts

Weekly charts

Year-end charts

Certifications

Radio and release history

In popular culture
"Good Girl" was made available for download on June 26, 2012 to play in Rock Band 3 Basic and Pro mode utilizing real guitar / bass guitar, and MIDI compatible electronic drum kits / keyboards plus vocal harmonies. The song is also available on the game Just Dance 4 available on the Xbox 360 Kinect, PlayStation 3 PlayStation Move, Wii and Wii U. The song is available as an exclusive to the NTSC version of the game in the Americas. The song is also a downloadable content (DLC) song on the European, Australian and New Zealand stores (PAL). This song is also available in Guitar Hero Live.

Adriana Louise sang the song in the second week of The Live Rounds on the third season of The Voice. Amber Carrington sang the song for her Blind Audition on the fourth season of The Voice. Kat Perkins sang the song for her Instant Save on the sixth season of The Voice; she later recorded a studio version for her 2014 EP, Fearless.

References

2012 singles
Carrie Underwood songs
Songs written by Carrie Underwood
Arista Nashville singles
Song recordings produced by Mark Bright (record producer)
Songs written by Ashley Gorley
Songs written by Chris DeStefano
2012 songs